

Track listing

Credits
All songs written by Winston Rodney
Published by Burning Music Publishing
Recorded at WOMAD Festival, Reading – England engineer Tim & Simon Roberts
Also recorded at Maritime Hall/2B Productions SF. San Francisco, California
Three Song: Not Stupid, This Man, Identity, – Engineer Pete Slauson
Mixed at TMF Studios NYC, NY.
Engineered by Michael Sauvage, Assisted by Carlos Sauetman
Mastering by FUN MASTERS / 136 rue Lamarck 75018 Paris
Photos Olivier Porrot
Artwork Cirem
Special Thanks to all the people fans and friends One Love Keep The Spear Burning
Paul Bent – Tour Engineer
Archibald Davis – Announcer

Musicians
Burning Band
Linford Carby – rhythm guitar
Stephen Stewart – keyboards
Num H.S. Amun’Tehu – percussion
Eugene Grey – lead guitar
Paul Beckford – bass
Nelson Miller – drums
James Smith – trumpet
Clyde Cummings – saxophone
Ronald Robinson – trombone

1998 live albums
Burning Spear live albums
Musidisc live albums